The 1961 Cal Poly Mustangs football team represented California Polytechnic State College—now known as California Polytechnic State University, San Luis Obispo—as a member of the California Collegiate Athletic Association (CCAA) during the 1961 NCAA College Division football season. Led by LeRoy Hughes in his 12th and final season as head coach, Cal Poly compiled an overall record of 4–4 with a mark of 3–2 in conference play, placing second in the CCAA. The Mustangs played home games at Mustang Stadium in San Luis Obispo, California.

Schedule

Team players in the NFL
No Cal Poly Mustangs were selected in the 1962 NFL Draft.

The following finished their college career in 1961, were not drafted, but played in the NFL.

Notes

References

Cal Poly
Cal Poly Mustangs football seasons
Cal Poly Mustangs football